Äksi is a small borough in Tartu Parish, Tartu County in Estonia. It is located on the southern shore of Lake Saadjärv, and has a population of 477 (as of 1 January 2010).

The Ice Age Centre, a museum about the latest ice age, is located in Äksi.

There is a Monument of the War of Independence in Äksi.

Gallery

References

Boroughs and small boroughs in Estonia
Tartu Parish